Devin (also Romanized as Devīn; also known as Deven, Doon, and Dūn) is a village in Dar Pahn Rural District, Senderk District, Minab County, Hormozgan Province, Iran. At the 2006 census, its population was 357, in 93 families.

References 

Populated places in Minab County